Agyneta kaszabi is a species of sheet weavers found in Kazakhstan, Mongolia and Russia. It was described by Loksa in 1965.

References

kaszabi
Spiders described in 1965
Spiders of Russia
Spiders of Asia
Arthropods of Mongolia